Cecil Ernest Boord (died 1969) was an American chemist.

He graduated in 1907 from Wabash College and joined Ohio State University. He earned the titles of "dean of hydrocarbon chemistry" and "designer and builder of gasolines" through his years of pioneering research in the syntheses and testing of hydrocarbon components of gasoline. In 1955, Dr. Boord was awarded the prized Joseph Sullivant Medal in recognition of "notable achievement" in the arts and sciences by an alumnus or faculty member of Ohio State.

The Boord olefin synthesis, a reaction he discovered in 1930, is named after him. It is a classic named reaction with high yields and broad scope.

He wrote the chapter on aliphatic compounds in the 1933 Annual Survey of American Chemistry published for the National Research Council.

External links
Annual Survey of American Chemistry

References

American chemists
Wabash College alumni
19th-century births
Year of birth missing
1969 deaths